Møre is the name of two traditional districts in different parts of Scandinavia.
Møre og Romsdal, Norway
Möre, Sweden

See also
Møre (newspaper), a newspaper in Møre og Romsdal county, Norway